Adam Fleming may refer to:

 Adam Fleming (journalist), British news reporter
 Adam Fleming (businessman), British billionaire